2022 South American Indoor Championships in Athletics was the second edition of the biennial indoor athletics competition between South American nations. The event was held in Cochabamba, Bolivia, on 19 and 20 February at the Estadio de Atletismo del Gobierno Autónomo Municipal de Cochabamba.

Medal summary

Men

Women

Medal table

Participation
Eleven member federations participated in the championships.

See also
2021 South American Championships in Athletics
Athletics at the 2020 Summer Olympics
2021 South American Under-23 Championships in Athletics
2022 World Athletics Indoor Championships
2022 World Athletics Championships
2022 Ibero-American Championships in Athletics
Athletics at the 2022 South American Games

References

External links
Results
Live results
Day 1 morning results
Day 1 evening results
Day 2 morning results
Day 2 evening results

2022
International athletics competitions hosted by Bolivia
Sport in Cochabamba
South American Championships in Athletics
South American Championships in Athletics
Athletics Championships
South American Championships in Athletics